The Rub' al Khali ((), the "Empty Quarter") is the sand desert (erg) encompassing most of the southern third of the Arabian Peninsula. It is part of the larger Arabian Desert.

Description

Terrain
The sand is of a reddish-orange color due to the presence of feldspar.

There are also brackish salt flats in some areas, such as the Umm al Samim area on the desert's eastern edge. Ali Al-Naimi reports that the sand dunes don't drift.  He goes on to say,
Sand blows off the surface, of course, but the essential shape of the dunes remains intact, probably due to the moisture leaching up into the base of the dunes from the surrounding sabkhas.

Lake beds
Along the middle length of the desert there are a number of raised, hardened areas of calcium carbonate, gypsum, marl, or clay that were once the site  of shallow lakes. These lakes existed during periods from 6,000 to 5,000 years ago and 3,000 to 2,000 years ago. The lakes are thought to have formed as a result of "cataclysmic rainfall" similar to present-day monsoon rains and most probably lasted for only a few years. However, lakes in the Mundafen area in the southwest of the Rub' al Khali show evidence of lasting longer, up to 800 years, due to increased runoff from the Tuwaiq Escarpment.

Evidence suggests that the lakes were home to a variety of flora and fauna. Fossil remains indicate the presence of several animal species, such as hippopotamus, water buffalo, and long-horned cattle. The lakes also contained small snails, ostracods, and when conditions were suitable, freshwater clams. Deposits of calcium carbonate and opal phytoliths indicate the presence of plants and algae. There is also evidence of human activity dating from 3,000 to 2,000 years ago, including chipped flint tools, but no actual human remains have been found.

Climate
Daily extremes of temperature are considerable.

Biodiversity
Fauna includes arachnids (e.g. scorpions) and rodents, while plants live throughout the Empty Quarter. As an ecoregion, the Rub' al Khali falls within the Arabian Desert and East Saharo-Arabian xeric shrublands. The Asiatic cheetahs, once widespread in Saudi Arabia, are regionally extinct from the desert.

Oil
The Shaybah oil field was discovered in 1968. South Ghawar, the largest oil field in the world, extends southward into the northernmost parts of the Empty Quarter.

Road
A road between Oman and Saudi Arabia, which goes through the Empty Quarter, was completed in September 2021.

History

Desertification has increased through recent millennia. Before desertification made the caravan trails leading across the Rub' al Khali so difficult, the caravans of the frankincense trade crossed now virtually impassable stretches of wasteland, until about 300 AD. It has been suggested that Ubar or Iram, a lost city, region or people, depended on such trade. The archaeological remains include a fortification/administration building, walls and bases of circular pillars. The traces of camel tracks, unidentifiable on the ground, appear in satellite images.

People
Today the inhabitants of the Empty Quarter are members of various local tribes – for example,  the Al Murrah tribe has the largest area mainly based between Al-Ahsa and Najran. The Banu Yam and Banu Hamdan (in Yemen and the Najran region of southern Saudi Arabia), and the Bani Yas (in the United Arab Emirates). A few road links connect these tribal settlements to the area's water resources and oil production centers.

Expeditions
The first documented journeys by non-resident explorers were made by British explorers Bertram Thomas and St. John Philby in the early 1930s.  Between 1946 and 1950, Wilfred Thesiger crossed the area several times and mapped large parts of the Empty Quarter including the mountains of Oman, as described in his 1959 book Arabian Sands.

In June 1950, a US Air Force expedition crossed the Rub' al Khali from Dhahran, Saudi Arabia, to central Yemen and back in trucks to collect specimens for the Smithsonian Institution and to test desert survival procedures.

In 1999, Jamie Clarke became the first Westerner to cross the Empty Quarter of Arabia in fifty years. His team of six, guided by three Bedouin, spent 40 days crossing the desert with a caravan of 13 camels.

On 25 February 2006, a scientific excursion organized by the Saudi Geological Survey began to explore the Empty Quarter. The expedition consisted of 89 environmentalists, geologists, and scientists from Saudi Arabia and abroad. Various types of fossilized creatures as well as meteorites were discovered in the desert. The expedition discovered 31 new plant species and plant varieties, as well as 24 species of birds that inhabit the region, which fascinated scientists as to how they have survived under the harsh conditions of the Empty Quarter.

On 4 February 2013, a South African team including Alex Harris, Marco Broccardo, and David Joyce became the first people to cross the border close to Oman of the Empty Quarter unsupported and on foot, in a journey which started in Salalah and lasted 40 days, eventually ending in Dubai. The team only made use of three water stops along the journey, and pulled a specially designed cart which housed all the supplies necessary for the entire expedition.

In 2013, British adventurer Alistair Humphreys released his first documentary film, Into the Empty Quarter, documenting his walk through the Empty Quarter desert with Leon McCarron. 

In 2013, from 18 February to 28 March, South Korean explorer Young-Ho Nam led a team (Agustin Arroyo Bezanilla, Si-Woo Lee) on a crossing through the Empty Quarter on foot from Salalah, Oman, to Liwa Oasis in the UAE Emirate of Abu Dhabi. The crossing was performed with permission from the governments of Oman and UAE. Dewan Ruler's Representative for Western Region, Emirate of Abu Dhabi recognized it as the world's first on-foot crossing of the Empty Quarter following the border of Oman and ending in UAE.

In 2018, the first all female walking expedition named "her faces of change" led by British Janey McGill who was accompanied by the first Omani women in modern times to walk the Oman Empty Quarter, Baida Al Zadjali and Atheer Al Sabri,  set off on the 22nd of December 2018 after receiving formal approval from the government of Oman. The team was supported by two cars for supplies driven by Tariq Al Zadjali (Omani) and Mark Vause-Jones (British) and filmmaker Matthew Milan from the United States of America. The expedition started from Al Hashman in the Dohafar Governate of Oman crossing through Burkana, Maqshin, and Al Sahma in Al Wusta Region continuing through Abu Al Tabool, Um Al Sameem ending at Ibri fort in Al Dhahira region of Oman. The total distance walked by the team was 758 km in 28 days ending the expedition on 18.01.2019.

In 2018, Deidre O'Leary and Kyle Knight crossed the Rub' al Khali from South (the Saudi-Omani boarder) to North (the Saudi-UAE boarder) on foot.  This was the first known crossing within Saudi Arabia from south-north on foot through the highest sand dunes of the Rub Al' Khali. The pair crossed 300 km in 9 days 12 hours and 59m minutes. 

In 2020, Italian extreme desert explorer Max Calderan completed Rub' al Khali exploration on foot for the first time ever from west to east. He crossed  in 18 days, crossing the widest area of Rub' al Khali from west to east.

In fiction

 Walter Farley's novel The Young Black Stallion (1989) is set partially in Rub' Al Khali.
 Josephine Tey's novel The Singing Sands (1952) investigates the murder of a young man who believes he has discovered the fabled city of Wabar while flying over the Rub' Al Khali.
 Carl Barks wrote McDuck of Arabia in 1965, an Uncle Scrooge comic book in which Scrooge and his nephews search for the "lost gold mine of the Queen of Sheba" in the Rub' al Khali.
 Tim Powers' 2001 novel Declare contains scenes in the Rub' al Khali, as well as mentioning St. John Philby's expedition to the same.
 The Abu Dhabi section of the Rub' al-Khali was used in location shooting for the desert planet Jakku in the 2015 film Star Wars: The Force Awakens.
 In the video game 80 Days, the desert is home to a legendary inventor who can help Passepartout to travel onwards.
 In Nelson DeMille's 2012 best-seller, The Panther, U.S. agents hunt down a terrorist to Rub' al Khali, and main character John Corey jokes that "The Empty Quarter" isn't a great name if promoting tourism.
 Rub' al Khali is one of the settings for the PlayStation 3 video game Uncharted 3: Drake's Deception, in which protagonist Nathan Drake searches for the Iram of the Pillars through multiple chapters.
 The Empty Quarter plays an important role in Clive Barker's Jericho, and in his novel Weaveworld.
 It serves as the site of Machine City, Zero-One, in the Matrix series.
 Gerald Seymour's novel Unknown Soldier is almost entirely set in the Rub' al Khali.
 Jack Higgins sets much of the action in his novels Edge of Danger and Midnight Runner in the Empty Quarter.
 Much of the SIGMA Force book Sandstorm by James Rollins takes place in the Empty Quarter.
 The Empty Quarter serves as the setting of the fictional "Ocean of Fire" horse race in the 2004 film Hidalgo.
 In the Japanese light novel series The Familiar of Zero, Rub' al Khali is thought to be the place of origin of the main character, Hiraga Saito.
 In Daniel Easterman's second novel, The Seventh Sanctuary, it is the location of the lost city of Iram, where the eponymous seventh sanctuary is situated.
 It is the site of Hammond Innes's novel The Doomed Oasis. Innes traveled to Saudi Arabia to research for this book.
 Rub' al Khali is shown in the PlayStation 3 video games Ninja Gaiden 3 and Ninja Gaiden 3: Razor's Edge, in which protagonist Ryu Hayabusa fights in the second day of his quest.
 The Rub' al-Khali is referenced in Fallout 4 by Jack Cabot as the location of an ancient city where his father found an artifact created by an intelligent predecessor to humans.
 The Rub' al-Khali is the location of the Jinn city of Irem in G. Willow Wilson's fantasy novel Alif the Unseen where part of the story takes place.
 The Empty Quarter is a pass location in Runic Games''' action role-playing game Torchlight II. It connects Zeryphesh to the Salt Barrens in game's Act II.
 The characters of Men in Black: International create a huge canyon in the Empty Quarter by test-firing an alien weapon.
 In the novel Jumper: Griffin's Story, Griffin O'Conner, the protagonist, visits the Quarter of Emptiness to practice his "Jumping" ability, and regularly "Jumps" there to escape danger.
 In the 2021 science fiction film Dune'', director Denis Villeneuve used locations in the Rub' al Khali in Abu Dhabi for scenes of the desert planet Arrakis.

Additional images

See also

 Ad-Dahna Desert
 Ramlat Khaliya
Rub' al Khali Basin
 Sharqiya Sands in Oman

Notes

References

External links

 Lost city under the Rub' Al-Khali, Saudi Life.
 Rub' al-Khali Encyclopædia Britannica
 Empty Quarter: Exploring Arabia's Sea of Sand National Geographic, May 2005 (interactive edition) (archived)

Arabian Peninsula
Deserts of Oman
Deserts of Saudi Arabia
Deserts of the United Arab Emirates
Deserts of Yemen
Ergs
Eastern Province, Saudi Arabia
Najd